Isaac Mbenza (born 8 March 1996) is a professional footballer who plays for Charleroi in the Belgian First Division A. Born in France, he has represented Belgium at several youth levels.

Club career
Born in France but living in Belgium since the age of 5, Mbenza started playing at ROFC Stockel at the age of 9 before moving on at the age of 15 to FC Brussels for a season, followed by another season at KV Mechelen before his move to Valenciennes FC.

Montpellier
On 31 January 2017, Mbenza signed for French club Montpellier.

Huddersfield Town
On 9 August 2018, Mbenza moved to Premier League club Huddersfield Town on a season-long loan with the obligation of a transfer in the summer of 2019.

He made his debut as a 68th minute substitute in a goalless draw with Cardiff City on 25 August 2018. On 5 May 2019, he scored his only goal in the 2018-19 season, coming as a 60th minute equaliser in the 1-1 draw with Manchester United.

Following Huddersfield's relegation to the EFL Championship, Mbenza's loan was made permanent on 9 July 2019 until the end of 2020-21 season, with the club having the option of a further season.

He only made 6 appearances for Huddersfield in the 2019-20 season, and departed on loan to Amiens on 3 Feb 2020  for the remainder of the season.

He featured more under the manager, Carlos Corberàn , who had been appointed in advance of 2020-21 season.  He made 37 appearances scoring 5 goals, with 3 coming direct from free kicks in games against Birmingham City, Sheffield Wednesday and Middlesbrough.

On 11 May 2021, Huddersfield exercised their option to extend Mbenza's contract up to the end of the 2021-22 season. But on 6 September, his contract was terminated.

Charleroi
On 14 March 2022, Mbenza signed a 3-month contract with Charleroi, with an option to extend.

International career
Mbenza was born in France and is of Congolese descent, and emigrated to Belgium at a young age.

Career statistics

References

External links

Living people
1996 births
Sportspeople from Saint-Denis, Seine-Saint-Denis
Association football forwards
Belgian footballers
Belgium under-21 international footballers
Belgium youth international footballers
French footballers
Belgian sportspeople of Democratic Republic of the Congo descent
French sportspeople of Democratic Republic of the Congo descent
Valenciennes FC players
Standard Liège players
Montpellier HSC players
Huddersfield Town A.F.C. players
Amiens SC players
Qatar SC players
R. Charleroi S.C. players
Ligue 1 players
Ligue 2 players
Championnat National 3 players
Belgian Pro League players
Premier League players
English Football League players
Qatar Stars League players
Belgian expatriate footballers
Belgian expatriate sportspeople in England
Expatriate footballers in England
Belgian expatriate sportspeople in Qatar
Expatriate footballers in Qatar
Footballers from Seine-Saint-Denis
Black French sportspeople
Black Belgian sportspeople